Vydra may refer to:
 Vydra (river) in the Czech Republic
 Vydra, Ukraine, a village (selo) in Brodivskyi Raion, Lviv Oblast, Ukraine
 21290 Vydra, a main belt asteroid
 Vydra (surname)

See also
 
 Wydra (disambiguation)
 Vidra (disambiguation)